Shamirah Nalugya (born 12 September 2003) is a Ugandan footballer who plays as an attacking midfielder for FUFA Women Super League club Kampala Queens Football Cub and the Uganda women's national team.

Early life
Nalugya was raised in Bweyogerere and belongs to the Baganda.

Club career
Nalugya has played for Isra soccer academy, Kawempe Muslims WL and currently in Kampala queens in Uganda.

International career
Nalugya capped for Uganda at senior level during the 2022 Africa Women Cup of Nations qualification.

International goals
Scores and results list Uganda goal tally first

References

External links

2003 births
Living people
People from Wakiso District
Ugandan women's footballers
Women's association football midfielders
Uganda women's international footballers
Ganda people
21st-century Ugandan women